Patricio David Schwob León (born 14 April 1986) is a Chilean former footballer who played as a striker. His last club was Deportes Pintana.

Career
As a player of Talagante city team, he joined Deportes Arica in the Primera B de Chile at the age of nineteen. Schwob played at all categories of the Chilean football, and retired in 2017 after playing for Deportes Pintana.

Personal life
Schwob is of German descent.

After retiring from football and developing several jobs in his homeland, Schwob moved to the United States at the end of 2022 thanks to a friend and works in new car parking.

References

External links
 
 

1986 births
Living people
Chilean people of German descent
Footballers from Santiago
Chilean footballers
San Marcos de Arica footballers
Deportes Magallanes footballers
Magallanes footballers
Trasandino footballers
Deportes Iberia footballers
Puerto Montt footballers
Cobreloa footballers
Deportes Concepción (Chile) footballers
Unión Temuco footballers
Deportes Temuco footballers
Curicó Unido footballers
Unión San Felipe footballers
Municipal La Pintana footballers
Chilean Primera División players
Primera B de Chile players
Tercera División de Chile players
Segunda División Profesional de Chile players
Association football forwards
Chilean expatriates in the United States